Warner Curb Records was a joint venture between Warner Bros. Records and producer Mike Curb to release his productions. The label was active between 1972 and 1983. In 1983, it folded into Curb Records.

See also
List of record labels

American record labels
Record labels established in 1972
Record labels disestablished in 1983
Warner Music labels
Former Time Warner subsidiaries
Joint ventures